Harutyun Hanesyan (December 30, 1911 – March 7, 1987) was a Turkish violist and composer. He was Armenian by ethnicity.

Biography 
Hanesyan was born on December 30, 1911, in Istanbul in the Ottoman Empire. He attended Esayan Lyceum and then Robert College. He graduated in 1931.

Alongside his academic pursuits, Hanesyan took lessons in violin and theory from composer Haroutioun Sinanian. At the invitation of the local YMCA, he and his sister, pianist Anahid Hanesyan, presented a joint recital on May 29, 1932, launching a career in music.

In 1944, Hanesyan joined the local symphony formed under the direction of composer Cemal Reşit Rey and remained with the ensemble until his retirement in 1972. During his tenure with the orchestra, he had many opportunities to play chamber music with Edgar Manas, Ekrem Zeki Ün, Lico Amar, Ferdi Statzer and Hüseyin Sadeddin Arel. Many of the public concerts were recorded and later broadcast on the Istanbul Municipal Radio Station.

Following his retirement from the orchestra, Hanesyan established his own chamber orchestra in 1973 and performed many of his compositions in Istanbul and elsewhere. He recorded an LP, featuring some of his instrumental music and vocal compositions sung by soprano Alis Manukyan.

Hanesyan composed some 50 works, most of them published in Istanbul, and some in Paris by Max Eschig. His musical vocabulary is plain, often tonal and centered. The pulse of his music is reminiscent of folk rhythms. They are mostly instrumental—a number of them for viola, the composer’s chosen instrument. The German-Armenian conductor Rolf Agop championed Hanesyan’s works and programmed them in various German cities.

Harutyun Hanesyan died on March 7, 1987. He is buried in the Şişli Armenian Cemetery.

Compositions

Orchestra

 Rapsodie for violin and string orchestra
 Rapsodie for oboe and string orchestra
 Romance for cello and string orchestra
 Bagatelle No. 1 for chamber orchestra
 Bagatelle No. 2 for flute and string orchestra
 Prelude for chamber orchestra
 Scene de ballet (Scene from a Ballet) for chamber orchestra
 Divertimento for string orchestra

Chamber music

 Berceuse (Lullaby) for violin and piano
 Nocturne for viola (or cello) and piano
 Menuetto for viola (or cello) and piano
 Élégie for viola (or cello) and piano
 Fantaisie concertante for viola and piano
 Andantino for viola (or violin) and piano (1960)
 Pastoral et rondo for viola and piano (1960)
 Prélude et Caprice for viola and piano (1960)
 Romance for viola and piano (1962)
 Duo-sérénade for violin and viola
 Cadenzas for viola concerti by Handel, Telemann, Dittersdorf, Hoffmeister, Stamitz and Zelter

Piano

 Fête (Festival)
 Հինկալա (Armenian Folk Song)
 Larghetto et allegro vivo
 Menuet en sol
 Vision
 Burlesque

Vocal

 Ղաբամա (Pumpkin Festival)
 Կուժն առա (I took the Jug)
  Գնա, գնա (Come, Come)
 Berceuse (Lullaby)

References

1911 births
1987 deaths
Turkish people of Armenian descent
Turkish composers
20th-century classical musicians
20th-century composers
Burials at Şişli Armenian Cemetery